Chris White (born 13 July 1955) is an English jazz/rock saxophonist who toured with Dire Straits from 1985–1995, and who has played with many bands and artists, including Robbie Williams, Paul McCartney, Chris De Burgh and Mick Jagger.

Biography
White took up the saxophone at the age of 13, whilst a pupil at Lawrence Weston Secondary School. He started gigging a couple of years later, and was soon playing in the National Youth Jazz Orchestra and touring with other musicians (such as France Gall). He joined Dire Straits in 1985 for their two final world tours, and played at both the Live Aid concert and Nelson Mandela's 70th Birthday Concert in 1988. In 2002 he joined the band again together with Mark Knopfler, Guy Fletcher, John Illsley and Danny Cummings in the four small reunion gigs in London and Beaulieu Abbey.

In May 1990, he joined The Notting Hillbillies and one year later, released his first and only solo album, Shadowdance. A motorcycle accident in 1993 prevented him from touring with Pink Floyd.

In 2007, White played with Tom Jones and Bryan Ferry at the Concert for Diana at Wembley Stadium.

He was part of The Straits, a former cover band and tribute band where "former members of Dire Straits perform the band's greatest hits", its members being Alan Clark, Chris White, Terence Reis, Steve Ferrone, Mickey Feat, Adam Philips and Jamie Squire.  The Dire Straits Legacy also planned, as of 2017, on releasing original material. He, along with the other members of "The Dire Straits Experience" also performed at a charity event in Gurgaon and Bangalore, India in March 2017.

Discography 
 Shadowdance, 1991.

References

External links
 Chris White Official Facebook Page.
 Chris White Management.
 Chris White Official Fan Site.
 Chris White - saxophone player.
 The Straits official website.

1955 births
Living people
Musicians from Bristol
English rock saxophonists
British male saxophonists
Robbie Williams Band members
21st-century saxophonists
21st-century British male musicians
National Youth Jazz Orchestra members
The Notting Hillbillies members